"S'il suffisait d'aimer" (meaning "If It Were Enough to Love") is the second single from Celine Dion's album, S'il suffisait d'aimer (1998). It was released on 23 November 1998 in Francophone countries and became the most successful single from this album. The song written and produced by Jean-Jacques Goldman.

Background and release
"S'il suffisait d'aimer" live music video was directed by Yannick Saillet during the Let's Talk About Love Tour in 1998. It was included later on Dion's On ne change pas DVD.

In Quebec, "S'il suffisait d'aimer" entered the chart on 7 November 1998, peaked at number five and spent forty weeks on it. The single was released in selected European countries, reaching number 4 in France, number 6 in Belgium Wallonia and number 19 in Europe. It was certified gold in France (265,000 copies sold) and Belgium (25,000).

A live version of "S'il suffisait d'aimer" appeared on the Au cœur du stade album and DVD. The latter also included the recording of this song as a bonus. Dion also performed it live during the French concerts of her 2008-09 Taking Chances Tour; this performance is included in the French edition of the Taking Chances World Tour: The Concert CD/DVD. It was also performed during her historic performance in front of 250,000 spectators to celebrate Quebec's 400th anniversary, which was included on Céline sur les Plaines DVD in 2008.  The song was also performed in the Sans attendre Tour of 2013; the performance in Quebec City is included in the Céline... une seule fois / Live 2013 CD/DVD. Dion also performed this song during her Summer Tour 2016, her French concerts in 2017 and select dates of her Courage World Tour.

The track became a part of the On ne change pas greatest hits compilation in 2005.

Formats and track listings
European CD single
"S'il suffisait d'aimer" – 3:35
"Tous les blues sont écrits pour toi" – 4:50

European CD single
"S'il suffisait d'aimer" – 3:35
"I'm Your Angel" (Radio Version) – 4:49

Charts

Weekly charts

Year-end charts

Certifications and sales

Release history

References

1998 singles
1998 songs
1990s ballads
Celine Dion songs
Columbia Records singles
Epic Records singles
French-language songs
Pop ballads
Songs written by Jean-Jacques Goldman